"Does She Love That Man?" is a song by British band Breathe from their 1990 album, Peace of Mind. The song was issued in November 1990 as Breathe’s third single from the album, and thirteenth overall. It was also the band's final single, and hit.

In the United States, the artist was billed as ‘Breathe featuring David Glasper’.

"Does She Love That Man?" peaked at #34 on the Billboard Hot 100 chart and at #17 on the Billboard Adult Contemporary chart in mid-January 1991. In Canada, the song reached #19 for two weeks the following month. The single did not reach the Top 100 singles chart in the United Kingdom.

Track listings 
UK 7” single (SIREN SRN134)

A. "Does She Love That Man?" [Radio Edit] - 3:59

B. "Where Angels Fear" - 4:50

US cassette single (A&M 75021 1535 4)

A. "Does She Love That Man?" [Album Version] - 4:46

B. "Say It" - 3:38 

UK CD single (SIREN SRNCD 134)

 "Does She Love That Man?" [Radio Edit]  - 3:59
 "Does She Love That Man?" [Album Version] - 4:46
 "Where Angels Fear" - 4:50
 "All This I Should Have Known" [U.S. Remix] - 3:57 

All songs written by David Glasper and Marcus Lillington. Published by BMG VM Music Limited.

Music video 
The music video for “Does She Love That Man?” was produced in 1990 and directed by Jesse Dylan.

Personnel

Band 

 David Glasper (vocals)
 Marcus Lillington (guitar, keyboards, programming)
 Ian Spice (drums)

Production 

 Engineer: John Gallen
 Mastered by Ian Cooper
 Mixed by Julian Mendelsohn
 A&R: Simon Hicks
 Art Direction, Design: John Warwicker, Vivid I.D.
 Management: Jonny Too Bad, Paul King
 Photography: Martin Brading

Charts

References

External links 
 

1990 songs
1990 singles
Breathe (British band) songs
Song recordings produced by Bob Sargeant
A&M Records singles
Virgin Records singles